Liometopum ventrosum is an extinct species of Miocene ants in the genus Liometopum. Described by Heer in 1849, fossils of the species were found in Switzerland.

References

†
Miocene insects
Prehistoric insects of Europe
Fossil taxa described in 1849
Fossil ant taxa